The Last of the Line is a 1914 American short silent Western film directed by Jay Hunt and featuring Joe Goodboy, Sessue Hayakawa, Tsuru Aoki, Stanley Bigham and Gladys Brockwell in pivotal roles.

References

External links 
 

1914 films
1914 Western (genre) films
1914 short films
American black-and-white films
American silent short films
Silent American Western (genre) films
Films directed by Jay Hunt
1910s American films